Heliotropium balfourii is a species of plant in the family Boraginaceae. It is endemic to Yemen.  Its natural habitats are subtropical or tropical dry forests and subtropical or tropical dry shrubland.

References

Endemic flora of Socotra
balfourii
Least concern plants
Taxonomy articles created by Polbot